Robert Ashton "Fats" Everett (February 24, 1915 – January 26, 1969) was an American Democratic Congressman from Tennessee from February 1, 1958 until his death in 1969.

Biography
Everett was a native of Obion County, Tennessee, being born on a farm near Union City. He was a 1936 graduate of Murray State College (now Murray State University).

Career
Elected to the Obion County Court (now called County Commission) in 1936, Everett was then elected, in 1938 as Obion County Circuit Court Clerk.  During World War II, he served in the United States Army from 1942 to 1945.  After the war he was an administrative assistant to Senator Tom Stewart from 1945 to 1949, and to Governor Gordon Browning from 1950 to 1952.  Afterwards, he became executive secretary of the Tennessee County Services Association.

In 1958, Everett entered the contest for the Eighth Congressional District seat of Jere Cooper, who had died in office.  He won the special election and served the balance of Cooper's term and five subsequent terms, serving from February 1, 1958 until his death in the first month of his seventh term.  Like the voters of his district, he was predominantly a conservative, largely reflecting the views of his party's Southern wing.

Death
Everett died of pneumonia and flu complications at Veterans Hospital in Nashville, Tennessee on January 26, 1969.  He is interred at East View Cemetery in Union City. There is a statue of him at the Obion County Courthouse in Union City, Tennessee.

See also
 List of United States Congress members who died in office (1950–99)

References

External links

1915 births
1969 deaths
20th-century American politicians
American Presbyterians
United States Army personnel of World War II
Deaths from influenza
Deaths from pneumonia in Tennessee
Democratic Party members of the United States House of Representatives from Tennessee
Murray State University alumni
People from Obion County, Tennessee